Pterolophia niasana is a species of beetle in the family Cerambycidae. It was described by Stephan von Breuning in 1938.

Subspecies
 Pterolophia niasana niasana Breuning, 1938
 Pterolophia niasana mentaweiana Breuning, 1969

References

niasana
Beetles described in 1938